Shweta Bhardwaj is an Indian actress and model who has acted in Hindi and Telugu language films. She made her debut in the 2008 action film Mission Istanbul, starring Vivek Oberoi & Zayed Khan. She has been a Gladrags Model.

Background
Born and brought up in Delhi, Shweta studied at Gargi College, and has an Honors degree in History. She made her debut as Lisa Lobo in the 2008 Apoorva Lakhia film Mission Istaanbul.

Filmography

References

External links

Actresses from Mumbai
Female models from Mumbai
Living people
Actresses in Hindi cinema
Actresses in Telugu cinema
21st-century Indian actresses
Indian film actresses
Gargi College alumni
Year of birth missing (living people)